Erotylidae, or the pleasing fungus beetles, is a family of beetles belonging to Cucujoidea containing over 100 genera. In the present circumscription, it contains 6 tribes (Tritomini, Dacnini, Megalodacnini, Erotylini, Cryptophilini, and Languriini) and 10 subfamilies (Cryptophilinae, Dacninae, Encaustinae, Erotylinae, Languriinae, Loberinae, Megalodacninae, Pharaxonothinae, Tritominae, and Xenoscelinae). In other words, the narrowly circumscribed Erotylidae correspond to the subfamily Erotylinae in the definition sensu lato. There are doubts on the monophyly of lower ranked taxa within Erotylidae, with further phylogenetic studies requiring better sampling and studies of unexplored character sets, for example the metendosternite and penile flagellum, which are generally lacking detailed morphological studies within the Coleoptera literature. The Eroytlina taxonomy is based on traits such as their different colors and not off morphological differences like mouthparts, thorax, and abdominal terminalia (Pecci-Maddalena). 

Erotylidae feed on plant and fungal matter; some are important pollinators (e.g. of the ancient cycads), while a few have gained notoriety as pests of some significance. Sometimes, useful and harmful species are found in one genus, e.g. Pharaxonotha. Most pleasing fungus beetles, however, are inoffensive animals of little significance to humans.

The oldests fossil is an undescribed specimen known from Early Cretaceous (Barremian) Lebanese amber.

Selected genera
These 160 genera belong to the family Erotylidae:

 Acropteroxys Gorham, 1887 i c g b
 Acryptophagus
 Aegithus Fabricius, 1801 g
 Amblyopus Lacordaire, 1842 g
 Amblyscelis Gorham, 1888
 Anadastus Gorham, 1887 g
 Apolybas Alvarenga, 1965 g
 Atomarops Reitter
 Aulacochilus Lacordaire, 1842
 Bacis Dejean, 1836 g
 Barytopus Chevrolat, 1836 g
 Bolerus Grouvelle
 Brachypterosa Zablotny & Leschen, 1996
 Brachysphaenus
 Caenolanguria Gorham, 1887 g
 Callischyrus
 Camptocarpus
 Cathartocryptus Sharp, 1886 i c g
 Chinophagus Ljubarsky, 1997 
 Cladoxena Motschulsky
 Cnecosa
 Coccimorphus Hope, 1841
 Coelocryptus Sharp, 1900
 Combocerus Bedel, 1868 g
 Coptengis Crotch, 1876
 Crotchia Fowler
 Crowsenguptus
 Cryptodacne Sharp, 1878 g
 Cryptophilus Reitter, 1874 i c g b
 Cycadophila Xu, Tang & Skelley, 2015 g
 Cypherotylus Crotch, 1873
 Cyrtomorphus Lacordaire, 1842 g
 Cytorea
 Dacne Latrielle, 1796
 Dactylotritoma Arrow, 1925 g
 Dapsa
 Dasydactylus Gorham, 1887 i c g b
 Doubledaya White, 1850 g
 Ectrapezidera
 Ellipticus Chevrolat, 1836 g
 Empocryptus Sharp
 Encaustes Lacordaire, 1842 g
 Epilanguria Fowler, 1908 g
 Episcapha Dejean, 1837
 Episcaphula Crotch
 Erotylina Curran, 1944 g
 Erotylus Fabricius, 1775
 Eutriplax Lewis, 1887
 Fitoa
 Goniolanguria
 Haematochiton Gorham, 1888 i c g b
 Hapalips Reitter, 1877 i c g b
 Henoticonus Reitter, 1878
 Hirsotriplax
 Hirsutotriplax Skelley, 1993 i c g b
 Homoeotelus Hope, 1841
 Hoplepiscapha Lea, 1922
 Hornerotylus g
 Iphiclus Chevrolat, 1836 g
 Ischyrus Lacordaire, 1842 i c g b
 Languria Latreille, 1802 i c g b
 Languriomorpha
 Langurites Motschulsky, 1860 i c g b
 Lepidotoramus Leschen, 1997 i c g
 Leucohimatium Rosenhauer, 1856
 Ligurana Chûjô, 1974 g
 Linodesmus  Bedel, 1882
 Loberogosmus Reitter
 Loberolus
 Loberonotha Sen Gupta and Crowson, 1969 i c g
 Loberopsyllus 
 Loberoschema Reitter 
 Loberus LeConte, 1861 i c g b
 Lobosternum Reitter, 1875 i c g
 Lybanodes
 Lybas Lacordaire, 1842 g
 Macromelea Hope
 Macrophagus Motschulsky
 Malleolanguria
 Megalodacne Crotch, 1873 i c g b
 Megischyrus Crotch, 1873 g
 Meristobelus
 Micrencaustes Crotch, 1875 g
 Microlanguria Lewis
 Microsternus Lewis, 1887 i c g b
 Mimodacne
 Mycetaea Stephens, 1829
 Mycolybas Crotch, 1876
 Mycophtorus Lacordaire, 1842 g
 Mycotretus Lacordaire, 1842 i c g b
 Neocladoxena Maeda, 1974 g
 Neodacne Chûjô, 1976 g
 Neoloberolus Leschen, 2003 i c g
 Neopriotelus Alvarenga, 1965 g
 Neosternus Dai & Zhao, 2013 g
 Neotriplax
 Neoxestus Crotch, 1875 g
 Nomotus 
 Oligocorynus Chevrolat, 1836 g
 Oretylus Heller, 1920 g
 Ortholanguria
 Othniocryptus Sharp, 1900
 Pachylanguria Crotch, 1875 g
 Paederolanguria Mader, 1939 g
 Paphezia Zablotny & Leschen, 1996
 Paracladoxena Fowler
 Paraxonotha g
 Pediacus
 Penolanguria Kolbe
 Pharaxonotha Reitter, 1875 i c g b
 Phricobacis Crotch, 1876 g
 Platoberus Sharp
 Prepopharus Erichson, 1847 g
 Promecolanguria
 Protoloberus Leschen, 2003 i c g
 Pselaphacus Percheron, 1835 g
 Pselaphandra Jacobson, 1904
 Pseudhapalips Champion
 Pseudhenoticus Sharp
 Pseudischyrus Casey, 1916 i c g b
 Pseudotritoma Gorham, 1888 g
 Rhodotritoma Arrow, 1925 g
 Scaphengis Gorham, 1888 g
 Scaphidomorphus Hope, 1841 g
 Scaphodacne Heller, 1918
 Scelidopetalon Delkeskamp, 1957 g
 Setariola Jakobson, 1915 g
 Sphenoxus Lacordaire, 1842 g
 Spondotriplax Crotch, 1875 g
 Stengita
 Stenodina
 Strongylosomus Chevrolat, 1836 g
 Tapinotarsus Kirsch, 1865 g
 Telmatoscius* Teretilanguria
 Tetralanguria Crotch, 1875 g
 Tetraphala g
 Tetratritoma Arrow, 1925 g
 Thallis 
 Thallisella Crotch
 Thallisellodes Arrow, 1925 g
 Tomarops Grouvelle, 1903
 Toramus Grouvelle, 1916 i c g b
 Trapezidera
 Trapezidistes Fowler, 1887 g
 Trichotritoma
 Trichulus
 Triplacidea Gorham, 1901
 Triplax Herbst, 1793 i c g b
 Tritoma Fabricius, 1775 i c g b
 Truquiella b
 Typocephalus Chevrolat, 1837 g
 Xenocryptus Arrow, 1929
 Xenohimatium Lyubarsky & Perkovsky, 2012 g
 Xenoscelinus Grouvelle, 1910 g
 Xenoscelis Wollaston, 1864 g
 Xestus Wollaston, 1864 g
 Zavaljus Reitter, 1880 g* Acropteroxys Gorham, 1887
 Zonarius (= Oligocorynus)
 Zythonia Westwood, 1874

Data sources: i = ITIS, c = Catalogue of Life, g = GBIF, b = Bugguide.net

References

External links
 
 
 Key to the British species of family Erotylidae

 
Cucujoidea families